The 1988–89 Philadelphia Flyers season was the Philadelphia Flyers' 22nd season in the National Hockey League (NHL). The Flyers lost in the Wales Conference Finals to the Montreal Canadiens in six games.

Regular season
With Mike Keenan's firing, the reins were handed off to Paul Holmgren, who presided over a club in flux with young players promoted to larger roles. The defense underwent a major overhaul, as Brad Marsh was let go to Toronto, and Doug Crossman was dealt to Los Angeles for Jay Wells. Gord Murphy and Jeff Chychrun cracked the lineup on the back line as well.

Tim Kerr was fully healed from his shoulder surgeries and subsequent infections, while Rick Tocchet, Scott Mellanby, Murray Craven, Pelle Eklund and Peter Zezel were counted on to carry the offense. After a promising 5–1–0 start, a 4–15–1 slide cost Zezel his job, shipped off to St. Louis for Mike Bullard after Thanksgiving.

Following the deal, the Flyers went 13–2–1 to climb back over .500 and into solid playoff footing. However, youth and constant inconsistency derailed much progress to the top of the standings, and the team never went higher than three games above even. Mark Laforest was replaced in March as backup by Maple Leafs castoff Ken Wregget with the team reeling.

On the last day of the season, they fell 6–5 in overtime to the Penguins and into fourth place, as Mario Lemieux scored into an empty net. If the Flyers had scored using the extra attacker, they would have leapt over the Rangers into third place in the Patrick Division. Despite their mediocre record, their positive goal differential was a positive indicator that the team still had some life left.

The Flyers finished the regular season with the league's best power-play percentage, at 26.70% (98 for 367).

Season standings

Playoffs
Facing the first-place Washington Capitals in the first round, the Flyers pulled off the upset in six games. Ron Hextall managed to score another empty-net goal in the waning moments of Game 5, becoming the first NHL goalie to score a goal in the playoffs. The Flyers then came back from a 3 games to 2 deficit to defeat the Pittsburgh Penguins in seven games to make the Wales Conference Finals before bowing out to the Montreal Canadiens in six games. This would be the Flyers last playoff appearance until 1995.

Schedule and results

Regular season

|- style="background:#cfc;"
| 1 || October 6 || New Jersey Devils || 4–1 || 1–0–0 || 2 || 
|- style="background:#cfc;"
| 2 || October 9 || Buffalo Sabres || 4–3 OT || 2–0–0 || 4 || 
|- style="background:#cfc;"
| 3 || October 13 || @ Minnesota North Stars || 7–6 || 3–0–0 || 6 || 
|- style="background:#cfc;"
| 4 || October 15 || @ Los Angeles Kings || 4–1 || 4–0–0 || 8 || 
|- style="background:#fcf;"
| 5 || October 18 || @ Pittsburgh Penguins || 2–4 || 4–1–0 || 8 || 
|- style="background:#cfc;"
| 6 || October 20 || Quebec Nordiques || 5–2 || 5–1–0 || 10 || 
|- style="background:#fcf;"
| 7 || October 22 || @ Hartford Whalers || 6–8 || 5–2–0 || 10 || 
|- style="background:#fcf;"
| 8 || October 23 || Calgary Flames || 4–5 OT || 5–3–0 || 10 || 
|- style="background:#fcf;"
| 9 || October 26 || @ New York Rangers || 3–4 || 5–4–0 || 10 || 
|- style="background:#cfc;"
| 10 || October 27 || New York Islanders || 5–2 || 6–4–0 || 12 || 
|- style="background:#fcf;"
| 11 || October 29 || New York Rangers || 5–6 || 6–5–0 || 12 || 
|-

|- style="background:#fcf;"
| 12 || November 1 || @ New Jersey Devils || 2–3 || 6–6–0 || 12 || 
|- style="background:#fcf;"
| 13 || November 3 || Vancouver Canucks || 2–5 || 6–7–0 || 12 || 
|- style="background:#cfc;"
| 14 || November 4 || @ Detroit Red Wings || 4–3 || 7–7–0 || 14 || 
|- style="background:#cfc;"
| 15 || November 6 || Pittsburgh Penguins || 5–4 || 8–7–0 || 16 || 
|- style="background:#fcf;"
| 16 || November 9 || @ New York Rangers || 3–5 || 8–8–0 || 16 || 
|- style="background:#fcf;"
| 17 || November 10 || Calgary Flames || 2–3 OT || 8–9–0 || 16 || 
|- style="background:#fcf;"
| 18 || November 12 || Detroit Red Wings || 4–5 || 8–10–0 || 16 || 
|- style="background:#ffc;"
| 19 || November 15 || New York Rangers || 3–3 OT || 8–10–1 || 17 || 
|- style="background:#fcf;"
| 20 || November 17 || St. Louis Blues || 1–3 || 8–11–1 || 17 || 
|- style="background:#fcf;"
| 21 || November 19 || @ Quebec Nordiques || 5–6 || 8–12–1 || 17 || 
|- style="background:#cfc;"
| 22 || November 20 || New Jersey Devils || 7–1 || 9–12–1 || 19 || 
|- style="background:#fcf;"
| 23 || November 22 || Los Angeles Kings || 1–6 || 9–13–1 || 19 || 
|- style="background:#fcf;"
| 24 || November 24 || @ Boston Bruins || 1–2 OT || 9–14–1 || 19 || 
|- style="background:#fcf;"
| 25 || November 26 || @ Pittsburgh Penguins || 3–4 || 9–15–1 || 19 || 
|- style="background:#fcf;"
| 26 || November 27 || @ Buffalo Sabres || 3–7 || 9–16–1 || 19 || 
|- style="background:#cfc;"
| 27 || November 29 || Boston Bruins || 5–1 || 10–16–1 || 21 || 
|-

|- style="background:#ffc;"
| 28 || December 1 || Montreal Canadiens || 2–2 OT || 10–16–2 || 22 || 
|- style="background:#cfc;"
| 29 || December 3 || @ New Jersey Devils || 5–3 || 11–16–2 || 24 || 
|- style="background:#cfc;"
| 30 || December 4 || New Jersey Devils || 6–2 || 12–16–2 || 26 || 
|- style="background:#fcf;"
| 31 || December 6 || @ Washington Capitals || 3–4 || 12–17–2 || 26 || 
|- style="background:#cfc;"
| 32 || December 8 || Pittsburgh Penguins || 4–3 || 13–17–2 || 28 || 
|- style="background:#cfc;"
| 33 || December 10 || Chicago Blackhawks || 6–4 || 14–17–2 || 30 || 
|- style="background:#cfc;"
| 34 || December 15 || Washington Capitals || 4–1 || 15–17–2 || 32 || 
|- style="background:#cfc;"
| 35 || December 17 || @ Toronto Maple Leafs || 7–1 || 16–17–2 || 34 || 
|- style="background:#cfc;"
| 36 || December 18 || Winnipeg Jets || 5–1 || 17–17–2 || 36 || 
|- style="background:#cfc;"
| 37 || December 22 || @ New York Islanders || 4–2 || 18–17–2 || 38 || 
|- style="background:#cfc;"
| 38 || December 23 || Hartford Whalers || 5–4 || 19–17–2 || 40 || 
|- style="background:#fcf;"
| 39 || December 27 || @ Washington Capitals || 3–4 || 19–18–2 || 40 || 
|- style="background:#cfc;"
| 40 || December 29 || @ Pittsburgh Penguins || 3–2 || 20–18–2 || 42 || 
|- style="background:#cfc;"
| 41 || December 31 || @ Buffalo Sabres || 3–2 || 21–18–2 || 44 || 
|-

|- style="background:#cfc;"
| 42 || January 3 || @ New York Islanders || 4–1 || 22–18–2 || 46 || 
|- style="background:#fcf;"
| 43 || January 5 || @ Minnesota North Stars || 3–5 || 22–19–2 || 46 || 
|- style="background:#fcf;"
| 44 || January 7 || @ St. Louis Blues || 4–7 || 22–20–2 || 46 || 
|- style="background:#cfc;"
| 45 || January 10 || Minnesota North Stars || 3–2 || 23–20–2 || 48 || 
|- style="background:#cfc;"
| 46 || January 12 || Quebec Nordiques || 7–2 || 24–20–2 || 50 || 
|- style="background:#fcf;"
| 47 || January 15 || Detroit Red Wings || 4–8 || 24–21–2 || 50 || 
|- style="background:#fcf;"
| 48 || January 17 || @ Vancouver Canucks || 3–5 || 24–22–2 || 50 || 
|- style="background:#ffc;"
| 49 || January 20 || @ Edmonton Oilers || 1–1 OT || 24–22–3 || 51 || 
|- style="background:#cfc;"
| 50 || January 21 || @ Winnipeg Jets || 7–3 || 25–22–3 || 53 || 
|- style="background:#fcf;"
| 51 || January 26 || Washington Capitals || 0–1 || 25–23–3 || 53 || 
|- style="background:#cfc;"
| 52 || January 28 || New York Islanders || 7–4 || 26–23–3 || 55 || 
|-

|- style="background:#fcf;"
| 53 || February 2 || Pittsburgh Penguins || 3–5 || 26–24–3 || 55 || 
|- style="background:#cfc;"
| 54 || February 5 || @ Washington Capitals || 3–1 || 27–24–3 || 57 || 
|- style="background:#fcf;"
| 55 || February 9 || Edmonton Oilers || 1–3 || 27–25–3 || 57 || 
|- style="background:#fcf;"
| 56 || February 11 || @ Toronto Maple Leafs || 3–4 || 27–26–3 || 57 || 
|- style="background:#fcf;"
| 57 || February 12 || Vancouver Canucks || 2–3 || 27–27–3 || 57 || 
|- style="background:#cfc;"
| 58 || February 14 || New York Rangers || 3–1 || 28–27–3 || 59 || 
|- style="background:#fcf;"
| 59 || February 16 || Montreal Canadiens || 4–7 || 28–28–3 || 59 || 
|- style="background:#fcf;"
| 60 || February 18 || @ New York Islanders || 2–3 || 28–29–3 || 59 || 
|- style="background:#cfc;"
| 61 || February 19 || New York Islanders || 5–4 || 29–29–3 || 61 || 
|- style="background:#cfc;"
| 62 || February 22 || @ New York Rangers || 6–4 || 30–29–3 || 63 || 
|- style="background:#cfc;"
| 63 || February 24 || @ New Jersey Devils || 6–2 || 31–29–3 || 65 || 
|- style="background:#fcf;"
| 64 || February 27 || Calgary Flames || 3–6 || 31–30–3 || 65 || 
|-

|- style="background:#ffc;"
| 65 || March 1 || @ Winnipeg Jets || 4–4 OT || 31–30–4 || 66 || 
|- style="background:#fcf;"
| 66 || March 4 || @ Los Angeles Kings || 2–6 || 31–31–4 || 66 || 
|- style="background:#ffc;"
| 67 || March 7 || Edmonton Oilers || 4–4 OT || 31–31–5 || 67 || 
|- style="background:#ffc;"
| 68 || March 9 || @ New York Islanders || 4–4 OT || 31–31–6 || 68 || 
|- style="background:#cfc;"
| 69 || March 11 || Chicago Blackhawks || 7–2 || 32–31–6 || 70 || 
|- style="background:#ffc;"
| 70 || March 12 || @ Hartford Whalers || 3–3 OT || 32–31–7 || 71 || 
|- style="background:#fcf;"
| 71 || March 16 || St. Louis Blues || 3–4 OT || 32–32–7 || 71 || 
|- style="background:#fcf;"
| 72 || March 18 || @ Boston Bruins || 3–6 || 32–33–7 || 71 || 
|- style="background:#cfc;"
| 73 || March 19 || Toronto Maple Leafs || 8–6 || 33–33–7 || 73 || 
|- style="background:#cfc;"
| 74 || March 22 || @ Chicago Blackhawks || 3–2 || 34–33–7 || 75 || 
|- style="background:#fcf;"
| 75 || March 24 || @ Washington Capitals || 1–6 || 34–34–7 || 75 || 
|- style="background:#cfc;"
| 76 || March 25 || New York Rangers || 6–1 || 35–34–7 || 77 || 
|- style="background:#fcf;"
| 77 || March 27 || @ New Jersey Devils || 3–5 || 35–35–7 || 77 || 
|- style="background:#cfc;"
| 78 || March 30 || Washington Capitals || 5–4 || 36–35–7 || 79 || 
|-

|- style="background:#ffc;"
| 79 || April 1 || @ Montreal Canadiens || 2–2 OT || 36–35–8 || 80 || 
|- style="background:#fcf;"
| 80 || April 2 || Pittsburgh Penguins || 5–6 OT || 36–36–8 || 80 || 
|-

|-
| Legend:

Playoffs

|- style="background:#fcf;"
| 1 || April 5 || @ Washington Capitals || 2–3 OT || Capitals lead 1–0 || 
|- style="background:#cfc;"
| 2 || April 6 || @ Washington Capitals || 3–2 || Series tied 1–1 || 
|- style="background:#fcf;"
| 3 || April 8 || Washington Capitals || 3–4 OT || Capitals lead 2–1 || 
|- style="background:#cfc;"
| 4 || April 9 || Washington Capitals || 5–2 || Series tied 2–2 || 
|- style="background:#cfc;"
| 5 || April 11 || @ Washington Capitals || 8–5 || Flyers lead 3–2 || 
|- style="background:#cfc;"
| 6 || April 13 || Washington Capitals || 4–3 || Flyers win 4–2 || 
|-

|- style="background:#fcf;"
| 1 || April 17 || @ Pittsburgh Penguins || 3–4 || Penguins lead 1–0 || 
|- style="background:#cfc;"
| 2 || April 19 || @ Pittsburgh Penguins || 4–2 || Series tied 1–1 || 
|- style="background:#fcf;"
| 3 || April 21 || Pittsburgh Penguins || 3–4 OT || Penguins lead 2–1 || 
|- style="background:#cfc;"
| 4 || April 23 || Pittsburgh Penguins || 4–1 || Series tied 2–2 || 
|- style="background:#fcf;"
| 5 || April 25 || @ Pittsburgh Penguins || 7–10 || Penguins lead 3–2 || 
|- style="background:#cfc;"
| 6 || April 27 || Pittsburgh Penguins || 6–2 || Series tied 3–3 || 
|- style="background:#cfc;"
| 7 || April 29 || @ Pittsburgh Penguins || 4–1 || Flyers win 4–3 || 
|-

|- style="background:#cfc;"
| 1 || May 1 || @ Montreal Canadiens || 3–1 || Flyers lead 1–0 || 
|- style="background:#fcf;"
| 2 || May 3 || @ Montreal Canadiens || 0–3 || Series tied 1–1 || 
|- style="background:#fcf;"
| 3 || May 5 || Montreal Canadiens || 1–5 || Canadiens lead 2–1 || 
|- style="background:#fcf;"
| 4 || May 7 || Montreal Canadiens || 0–3 || Canadiens lead 3–1 || 
|- style="background:#cfc;"
| 5 || May 9 || @ Montreal Canadiens || 2–1 OT || Canadiens lead 3–2 || 
|- style="background:#fcf;"
| 6 || May 11 || Montreal Canadiens || 2–4 || Canadiens win 4–2 || 
|-

|-
| Legend:

Player statistics

Scoring
 Position abbreviations: C = Center; D = Defense; G = Goaltender; LW = Left Wing; RW = Right Wing
  = Joined team via a transaction (e.g., trade, waivers, signing) during the season. Stats reflect time with the Flyers only.
  = Left team via a transaction (e.g., trade, waivers, release) during the season. Stats reflect time with the Flyers only.

Goaltending
  = Joined team via a transaction (e.g., trade, waivers, signing) during the season. Stats reflect time with the Flyers only.
  = Left team via a transaction (e.g., trade, waivers, release) during the season. Stats reflect time with the Flyers only.

Awards and records

Awards

Records

Among the team records set during the 1988–89 season was a trio of powerplay goal records on October 13. Brian Propp tied a team record by scoring three of the Flyers six powerplay goals in the game (also tied for the team record), including four overall by the team in the second period, which set the team record for a single period. From March 1 to March 19, Rick Tocchet scored a goal in a team record nine consecutive games. On March 7, Tim Kerr scored eight seconds into the start of a game, the fastest in team history. Ron Hextall set an NHL record for most penalty minutes (113) by a goaltender in a single season. The Flyers set a team record for most powerplay goals (98) and tied another for fewest shutouts (0).

During game five of the division final playoff series against the Pittsburgh Penguins, the Flyers allowed six goals during the first period, tying a team record, and ten goals during the game, setting a team record that was later tied. Pelle Eklund tied an NHL playoff record during the game for fastest goal from the start of a period, scoring six second into the second period. Kerr set team records for most goals (10), points (15), and powerplay goals (5) during the series. The Flyers also set records during the series for most shorthanded goals (4) and most penalties (94). In game one of the conference finals against the Montreal Canadiens, the Flyers tied a team record for most shorthanded goals scored (2).

Tim Kerr set a team record during the playoffs for most powerplay goals scored (8) while Mark Howe’s 15 assists is a franchise high among defensemen. The seven shorthanded goals scored and 610 penalty minutes by the team are franchise playoff highs.

Transactions
The Flyers were involved in the following transactions from May 27, 1988, the day after the deciding game of the 1988 Stanley Cup Finals, through May 25, 1989, the day of the deciding game of the 1989 Stanley Cup Finals.

Trades

Players acquired

Players lost

Signings

Draft picks

NHL Entry Draft
Philadelphia's picks at the 1988 NHL Entry Draft, which was held at the Montreal Forum in Montreal, Quebec, on June 11, 1988.

NHL Supplemental Draft
Philadelphia's picks at the 1988 NHL Supplemental Draft.

Farm teams
The Flyers were affiliated with the Hershey Bears of the AHL.

Notes

References
General
 
 
 
Specific

1988–89 NHL season by team
1988–89 in American ice hockey by team
1988
Philadelphia
Philadelphia